Mohamed Rashid Mohamed Ali Srour Al Naqbi (born 28 September 1978) is an Emirati former footballer who played as a striker. He played for United Arab Emirates in the 2004 AFC Asian Cup.

International goals

References

Living people
Emirati footballers
Emirati expatriate footballers
United Arab Emirates international footballers
Association football forwards
2004 AFC Asian Cup players
Dibba Al-Hisn Sports Club players
Al-Shaab CSC players
FC Thun players
Al Ahli Club (Dubai) players
Al Jazira Club players
Sharjah FC players
Dibba FC players
UAE First Division League players
UAE Pro League players
Expatriate footballers in Switzerland
Emirati expatriate sportspeople in Switzerland
1978 births